Padmapara High School was established in 1981 in the south east corner of Barpeta district at Padmapara Village, Assam, India. Md Mulam Khan was the first headmaster of this school.  This school is playing a very important rule in proving quality in these area. This school has provincialised in 1991 . Now the school is situated at Padmapara Village about 20km away from Barpeta. There are 18 staff and around 250 students. The language of instruction is Assamese. Students of this school appear for High School Leaving Certificate (class 10 exam) under the Board of Secondary Education, Assam.

References

High schools and secondary schools in Assam
Barpeta district
Educational institutions established in 1981
1981 establishments in Assam